Nine-Thirty is the tenth album by Jandek, one of two released in 1985, and was released as Corwood 0748. It was reissued on CD in 2001.

Track listing

References

External links
Seth Tisue's Nine-Thirty review

1985 albums
Corwood Industries albums
Jandek albums